Janis P. Sarra is a Canadian lawyer, currently the UBC Distinguished Professor of Law and founding Director of the Director of the National Centre for Business Law at the Peter A. Allard School of Law, University of British Columbia (UBC), and also a published author. She was previously the UBC's Director of the Peter Wall Institute for Advanced Studies, the university's Senator from 2003 to 2008, and also, until 2007, the Allard School of Law's Associate Dean.

References

Living people
Academic staff of the University of British Columbia
Canadian lawyers
Academic staff of the University of Toronto
University of Toronto alumni
Year of birth missing (living people)